The Battle of Bassignana may refer to any of the following battles. 
 Battle of Bassignano (1745), during the War of the Austrian Succession
 Battle of Bassignana (1799), during the French Revolutionary Wars

Battles involving Italy